

Results
Arsenal's score comes first

Football League First Division

Final League table

FA Cup

References

1909-10
English football clubs 1909–10 season